Carbonic anhydrase 3 is an enzyme that in humans is encoded by the CA3 gene.

Carbonic anhydrase III (CAIII) is a member of a multigene family (at least six separate genes are known) that encode carbonic anhydrase isozymes. These carbonic anhydrases are a class of metalloenzymes that catalyze the reversible hydration of carbon dioxide and are differentially expressed in a number of cell types. The expression of the CA3 gene is strictly tissue-specific and present at high levels in skeletal muscle and much lower levels in cardiac and smooth muscle. CA3 is insufficient in muscles of Myasthenia Gravis patients. A proportion of carriers of Duchenne muscle dystrophy have a higher CA3 level than normal. Autoantibodies to CA3 have been found to be significantly higher in patients with rheumatoid arthritis, systemic lupus erythematosus, and type 1 diabetes. The gene spans 10.3 kb and contains seven exons and six introns.

References

Further reading

External links